Michel Simon (9 April 1895 – 30 May 1975) was a Swiss-French actor. He appeared in many notable French films, including La Chienne (1931), Boudu Saved from Drowning (1932), L'Atalante (1934), Port of Shadows (1938), The Head (1959), and The Train (1964).

Early years
Simon was born on 9 April 1895 in Geneva, Switzerland to a Catholic butcher and a Protestant mother. He left his family and moved to Paris, where he first lived at the Hotel Renaissance, Saint-Martin Street, then in Montmartre. He worked many different jobs to survive, such as giving boxing lessons and peddling smuggled lighters.

His career began modestly in 1912, working as a magician, clown, acrobat, and stooge in a dancers' show called "Ribert's and Simon's", in the Montreuil-sous-Bois Casino.

Conscripted into the Swiss Army in 1914, he spent time in the stockade. He also contracted tuberculosis.

In 1915, while on leave, he saw Georges Pitoëff's early work in the French language, at the Theatre de la Comédie of Geneva, acting in Hedda Gabler, and was inspired to become an actor himself. In 1920 he made his first brief appearance on stage, with Pitoëff's company, speaking three lines in Shakespeare's Measure for Measure. He also worked at this time as the company's photographer. One of his early successes was a supporting role in George Bernard Shaw's Androcles and the Lion. In 1922, Pitoëff's company moved to Paris at the Comédie des Champs-Élysées.

Simon quit the company in 1923 to become a light comedy actor in plays by Tristan Bernard, Marcel Achard and Yves Mirande. Achard presented him to Charles Dullin, in whose company he acted in Je ne vous aime pas with Valentine Tessier.

Theatrical success and his transition to film
Louis Jouvet, who had replaced Pitoëff, hired Simon at the Comédie des Champs-Élysées. Simon then gave a successful performance in Archard's Jean de la Lune as Cloclo. 

In the 1930s, Simon's theatrical career rose to prominence with performances in works by Shakespeare, Bernard Shaw, Pirandello, Oscar Wilde, Bourdet, and Henri Bernstein. However, it was film that brought him stardom and international recognition. 

Simon's first film appearance was in the 1925 silent film, Feu Mathias Pascal, adapted from a Pirandello novel and directed by Marcel L'Herbier. In the same year, he starred in the modestly budgeted The Vocation of André Carel, directed by Jean Choux. As the silent era ended, he appeared in Carl Theodor Dreyer's The Passion of Joan of Arc (1928).

Simon's film career was boosted with the advent of talking pictures. People remarked that his elocution and gravelly voice were as original as his appearance. These features were exploited by notable 1930s French directors, including Jean Renoir (La Chienne, Boudu Saved From Drowning), Jean Vigo (L'Atalante) and Marcel Carné (Port of Shadows, Bizarre, Bizarre).

He appeared in 55 plays from 1920 to 1965, and 101 from 1965 to 1975.

In the 1950s, Simon reined in his activities following an accident involving a makeup dye that left part of his face and body paralyzed.

In 1967, he won the Silver Bear for Best Actor at the 17th Berlin International Film Festival for his role in The Two of Us.

He died at 80 years of age from a pulmonary embolism and is buried in the Grand-Lancy Cemetery of Geneva, next to his parents.

Eccentricities

Simon would say that he preferred "living with animals than humans". He lived for a long time in a bohemian house in Noisy-le-Grand, near Paris. He built a series of exterior wire tunnels that linked the various floors and allowed his pet monkeys freedom to roam around. The house was filled with bric-a-brac, including his large collection of erotic photographs and films. The collection was dispersed after his death.

Selected filmography

 La galerie des monstres (1924)
 The Vocation of André Carel (1925), Gaston Lebeau
 Feu Mathias Pascal (1926, directed by Marcel L'Herbier), Jérôme Pomino
 L'inconnue des six jours (1926), Le valet de chambre
 The Loves of Casanova (1927), Sbire
 The Passion of Joan of Arc (1928, directed by Carl Theodor Dreyer), Jean Lemaître
 Tire au flanc (1928), Joseph Turlot
 Pivoine (1929)
 L'enfant de l'amour (1930), Lorédan
 Jean de la Lune (1931), Clothaire dit Clo-Clo
 On purge bébé (1931, directed by Jean Renoir), Chouilloux
 La Chienne (1931, directed by Jean Renoir), Maurice Legrand
 Baleydier (1932), Baleydier
 Boudu Saved from Drowning (1932, directed by Jean Renoir), Priape Boudu
 High and Low (1933, directed by G. W. Pabst), Maximilian Podeletz
 Léopold le bien-aimé (1934), M. Ponce
 Miquette (1934), Monchablon
 Lake of Ladies (1934), Oscar Lyssenhop
 L'Atalante (1934, directed by Jean Vigo), Old Jules
 Le Bonheur (1934, directed by Marcel L'Herbier), Noël Malpiaz
 Adémaï au moyen âge (1935), Lord Pickwickdam
 Amants et voleurs (1935), Perrot-Joly
 Under Western Eyes (1936), Lespara
 Moutonnet (1936), Frècheville
 The Brighton Twins (1936), Labrosse
 Girls of Paris (1936), Baron de Beaupoil and his brother
 Death on the Run (1936), Achille Baluchet
 Let's Make a Dream (1936), Un invité (prologue)
 Le choc en retour (1937), Laverdac
 Boulot aviateur (1937), Baron Gobèche
 The Silent Battle (1937), Sauvin
 Bizarre, Bizarre (1937, directed by Marcel Carné), Irwin Molyneux
 The Kiss of Fire (1937), Michel
 Mirages (1938), Michel
 Boys' School (1938, directed by Christian-Jaque), Lemel
 Port of Shadows (1939, directed by Marcel Carné), Zabel
 Les Nouveaux Riches (1938), Martinet
 Beautiful Star (1938), Léon
 Belle étoile (1938), Le comte Edouard de Bourgogne dit 'L'Escargot'
 Mother Love (1938), Michel Quercy
 Le règne de l'esprit malin (1938), Luc
 Noix de coco (1939), Josserand
 Eusèbe député (1939), Eusèbe Bonbonneau
 Behind the Facade (1939), Picking
 The End of the Day (1939), Cabrisssade
 The Last Turning (1939, based on the novel The Postman Always Rings Twice), Nick Marino
 Fric-Frac (1939, directed by Claude Autant-Lara & Maurice Lehmann), Jo
 Extenuating Circumstances (1939), M. Gaetan Le Sentencier, 'La Sentence'
 Love Cavalcade (1939), Diogenes, Monseigneur de Beaupré, and Lacouret
 Musicians of the Sky (1940), Captain Simon
 Paris-New York (1940), Commissioner Boucheron
 La Comédie du bonheur (1940, directed by Marcel L'Herbier), François Jourdain/Giambattista Giordano (Italian version, Ecco la felicità)
 Tosca (1941,  directed by Carl Koch), Baron Scarpia
 The King's Jester (1941), Rigoletto
 Girl of the Golden West (1942), Butler / Carras
 Shop Girls of Paris (1943), Baudu
 Vautrin the Thief (1943), Jacques Collin dit Vautrin
 A Friend Will Come Tonight (1946), Michel Lemaret
 Panic (Panique) (1946, directed by Julien Duvivier), Monsieur Hire
 La taverne du poisson couronné (1947), Capitaine Palmer
 Not Guilty (1947), Le docteur Michel Ancelin
 Les Amants du pont Saint-Jean (1947), Alcide Garonne
 La carcasse et le tord-cou (1948), Joseph Ferdinand Anselme Midot, dit 'Le tord-cou'
 Fabiola (1949), Senator Fabius Severus
 Beauty and the Devil (1950, directed by René Clair), Mephistopheles / Old Professor Henri Faust
 Poison (1951, directed by Sacha Guitry), Paul-Louis Victor Braconnier
 Monsieur Taxi (1952), Pierre Verger (Monsieur Taxi)
  (1952), Le commissaire Jules Maigret ("Le témoignage d'un enfant de choeur" segment)
 Das Geheimnis vom Bergsee (1952), Bürgermeister (French version)
 The Girl with the Whip (1952), Le tuteur d'Angelina
 The Temptress (1952), Cidoni
 Crimson Curtain (1952), Bertal / Banquo
 The Road to Damascus (1952), Caïphe
 The Merchant of Venice (1953), Shylock
 The Virtuous Scoundrel (1953), Albert and Alain Ménard-Lacoste
 Women of Paris (1953), Professor Charles Buisson
 Saadia (1953), Bou Rezza
 L'Étrange Désir de monsieur Bard (1954), Auguste Bard
 A Slice of Life (1954), Padre Silvio (segment "Casa d'altri")
 Hungarian Rhapsody (1954), General von Sayn-Wittgenstein
 At the Order of the Czar (1954), Prince de Sayn-Wittgenstein
 The Impossible Mr. Pipelet (1955, directed by André Hunebelle), Maurice Martin
 Mémoires d'un flic (1956), Le commissaire principal Henri Dominique
 La joyeuse prison (1956), Benoit - le surveillant-chef
 Les 3 font la paire (1957), Commissaire Bernard
 A Certain Monsieur Jo (1958), Joseph 'Jo' Guardini
 It Happened in Broad Daylight (1959, directed by Ladislao Vajda), Jacquier
 The Head (1959, directed by Victor Trivas), Professor Abel
 Austerlitz (1960), Alboise
  (1960, directed by François Villiers), Pierrot
 Candide ou l'optimisme au XXe siècle (1960, an adaptation of Voltaire's Candide), Colonel Nanar
  (1961) directed by Denys de la Patelliére), Charles-Edmond Larmentiel
 The Devil and the Ten Commandments (1962, directed by Julien Duvivier), Jérôme Chambard ("Dieu en vain ne jureras" and "Les Dimanches tu garderas" segments)
 Marco Polo (1962)
 The Train (1964, directed by John Frankenheimer), Papa Boule
 Cyrano and d'Artagnan (1964), Duc de Mauvières
 Deux heures à tuer (1966), L'employé de la consigne
 The Two of Us (1967, directed by Claude Berri), Pépé Dupont
 The Marriage Came Tumbling Down (1968), Le vieux Jéricho
 Contestazione generale (1970), Cavazza
 La maison (1970), Louis Compiegne
 Blanche (1971, directed by Walerian Borowczyk), Le châtelain
 The Most Wonderful Evening of My Life (1972, directed by Ettore Scola), Attorney Zorn
 Le boucher, la star et l'orpheline (1975), L'érotologue
  (1975, directed by Jean-Pierre Mocky)

References

External links

 
 
 
 
 Michel Simon at Films de France
 Geneva tourism website about his life

1895 births
1975 deaths
Swiss male film actors
Swiss male silent film actors
French male stage actors
French male film actors
French male silent film actors
Deaths from pulmonary embolism
Actors from Geneva
20th-century French male actors
Silver Bear for Best Actor winners
Swiss military personnel